Shamardi (also Romanized as Shāmardī; also known as Shāh Mardī) is a village in Bemani Rural District, Byaban District, Minab County, Hormozgan Province, Iran. At the 2006 census, its population was 1,186, in 223 families.

References 

Populated places in Minab County